Kent State University at East Liverpool (Kent State East Liverpool) is a satellite campus of Kent State University in East Liverpool, Ohio. Administered with Kent State University at Salem as part of Kent State University Columbiana County, Kent State East Liverpool offers bachelor's and associate degrees. The campus consists of two buildings in downtown East Liverpool; John J. Purinton Hall and the Mary Patterson Building. Together, the Columbiana County campuses serve more than 1,400 students.

History

Kent State East Liverpool was established in 1965 as an academic outreach of Kent State located in the International Brotherhood of Operative Potters building. It moved to its present location in 1968, purchasing the former East Liverpool High School downtown campus from the East Liverpool City School District. In the same year, the school was officially established as a Kent State University regional branch. In 2009, East Liverpool Campus and Kent State's Salem Campus merged administrators and faculty to become Kent State University Columbiana Campus, with both branches remaining in their respective locations.

Academics
Like other Kent State regional campuses, students at Kent State Kent State East Liverpool can begin coursework for any of the undergraduate majors available at Kent State.  Between the downtown campus and the Salem campus, more than 20 degrees are offered, including 12 bachelor's degrees. Tuition is also lower than at the main campus in Kent for in-state, lower division classes. Out-of-state tuition for residents in select counties in West Virginia and Pennsylvania was reduced in the spring of 2010. Residents must reside in either Brooke, Hancock or Ohio counties in West Virginia, or, Allegheny, Beaver, Butler, Crawford, Erie, Lawrence or Mercer county in Western Pennsylvania.

Notable alumni
Daniel Johnston - artist, singer and songwriter

References

External links

Kent State University
East Liverpool, Ohio
Education in Columbiana County, Ohio
Buildings and structures in Columbiana County, Ohio
1965 establishments in Ohio
Educational institutions established in 1965